Across the Bridge is a 1957 British thriller film directed by Ken Annakin and starring Rod Steiger, David Knight and Bernard Lee. It is based on the 1938 short story "Across the Bridge" by Graham Greene. According to his obituary, it was director Annakin's favourite film.

Plot

Carl Schaffner (Rod Steiger) is a widowed British businessman, born in Germany, who flees to Mexico with the police hot on his heels after stealing company funds. He has a fortune stashed in a Mexican bank to keep it out of reach of the British authorities. While traveling by train, Schaffner drugs and switches identities with fellow train passenger Paul Scarff (Bill Nagy), who looks like him and has a Mexican passport. He throws Scarff off the train, injuring Scarff.  As part of the ruse, Carl is forced to take possession of Scarff's dog. The plan seems foolproof, but it backfires when Carl, discovers that Scarff is a wanted political assassin. Carl tracks down Scarff, who is incapacitated by his injuries, and gets back his original passport. Carl arrives in Mexico and is captured by the local police, who mistake him for Scarff. Carl has to reveal his true identity to the local police, but at first he is not believed. He tells the Mexican police where to find the real Scarff and they pass the information to the American police, and Scarf is killed when they go to arrest him. The local Mexican police chief, who at first seemed amenable to Schaffner’s approaches to bribe him, connects with Scotland Yard inspector Hadden. They conspire to keep Schaffner trapped in the Mexican border town of Katrina, and then will try to get him to cross the bridge into the U.S., where he can be apprehended. The misanthropic Schaffner has by now grown attached to Scarff's pet spaniel. He is tricked by Hadden and the police chief into having to cross the dividing line of the bridge to recover the dog. Schaffner realizes what is happening, but is determined to get the dog back. He is accidentally killed when he tries to run back across the border and a police car knocks him down. The realization of his own humanity has cost the cynical, friendless Schaffner his life.

Cast
Rod Steiger as Carl Schaffner
David Knight as Johnny
Marla Landi as Mary
Noel Willman as Chief of Police
Bernard Lee as Chief Inspector Hadden
Eric Pohlmann as Police Sergeant
Alan Gifford as Cooper
Ingeborg von Kusserow as Mrs. Scarff (as Ingeborg Wells)
Bill Nagy as Paul Scarff
Faith Brook as Kay
Marianne Deeming as Anna

Production
The story was expanded by the screenwriter to provide a backstory for the lead character played by Rod Steiger. Steiger accepted the role not long after achieving fame for his role in On the Waterfront. Charles Laughton had originally been proposed for the lead. In his autobiography the director Ken Annakin recalled that once Steiger had studied his lines, he never referred to the script for the entire shoot. Annakin travelled by train from New York to Laredo, Texas to scout locations. However, most exteriors were shot in Lora del Río, Spain, about an hour outside Seville. It was lensed by cinematographer Reginald Wyer. Only establishing shots were filmed in the United States, using a documentary film crew. Filming started 21 January 1957.

Reception
Reviews for the film were mostly positive. Britmovie's review of the film singles out Steiger's performance as one of the film's highlights: "Rod Steiger produces a gripping and highly charismatic performance as the conceited financier trapped in limbo with luck running out."

An American comedy remake, Double Take, was released in 2001.

References

Bibliography
 Rank Film Library,"16mm Entertainment Film Catalogue 1978,9"

External links

1957 films
1950s chase films
1950s crime thriller films
British black-and-white films
British chase films
British crime thriller films
Films based on short fiction
Films set in Mexico
Films directed by Ken Annakin
Films scored by James Bernard
Films based on works by Graham Greene
Films about identity theft
1950s English-language films
1950s British films